Professional Graduate Diploma may refer to:

 Professional Graduate Diploma in Information Technology - An academic qualification equal to the third (final) year of a UK honors degree, awarded by the British Computer Society (BCS)
 Professional Graduate Diploma in Education - A one-year course in Scotland for undergraduate degree holders